Daughter of the West is a 1949 American Western film directed by Harold Daniels and starring Martha Vickers, Phillip Reed and Donald Woods.

The film's sets were designed by the art director George Van Marter.

Plot

Cast
 Martha Vickers as Lolita Moreno 
 Phillip Reed as Navo White Eagle 
 Donald Woods as Commissioner Ralph C. Connors 
 Marion Carney as Okeeman (Atoka) 
 Pedro de Cordoba as Chief Wykomas 
 James Griffith as Jed Morgan 
 William Farnum as Father Vallejo 
 Luz Alba as Wateeka 
 Tommy Cook as Ponca 
 Tony Barr as Yuba 
 Helen Servis as Mrs. Beggs 
 Milton Kibbee as Mr. Beggs

References

Bibliography
 Goble, Alan. The Complete Index to Literary Sources in Film. Walter de Gruyter, 1999.

External links
 

1949 films
1949 Western (genre) films
American Western (genre) films
Films directed by Harold Daniels
Film Classics films
1940s English-language films
1940s American films